Robert Ivers (born 25 April 1969) is an Australian judoka. He competed in the men's middleweight event at the 2000 Summer Olympics.

References

External links
 

1969 births
Living people
Australian male judoka
Olympic judoka of Australia
Judoka at the 2000 Summer Olympics
Place of birth missing (living people)